Erebia niphonica is an East Palearctic species of satyrine butterfly endemic to Japan, Sakhalin and the Kuril Islands.

The larva on feeds on Calamagrostis and Carex species.

Subspecies
E. n. niphonica (Sakhalin)
E. n. doii Nakahara, 1926 (Kuriles)
E. n. mikuniana Nakahara, 1942 (Japan)
E. n. mikudai Nakahara (Japan)
E. n. sakae Torii, 1945 (Japan)
E. n. okadai Torii, 1945 (Japan)
E. n. hayachineana Okano, 1954 (Japan)
E. n. sugitanii Shirôzu, 1957 (Japan)
E. n. shibutsuana Shirôzu, 1957 (Japan)
E. n. gassana Okano & Doi, 1957 (Japan: Honshu)
E. n. yakeishidakeana Okano, 1958 (Japan: northern Honshu)
E. n. shirahatai Okano, 1958 (Japan: northern Honshu)
E. n. asahidakeana Okano, 1958 (Japan: northern Honshu)
E. n. nyukasana Murayama, 1963 (Japan)
E. n. tateyamana Murayama, 1963 (Japan)
E. n. yoshisakana Murayama, 1963 (Japan)
E. n. amarisana Murayama, 1964 (Japan)
E. n. togakusiana Murayama, 1964 (Japan)
E. n. expleta Churkin, 2005 (Sakhalin)

References

Erebia
Butterflies described in 1877
Butterflies of Asia
Taxa named by Oliver Erichson Janson